Mariya Igorevna Sidorova (born 21 November 1979) is a Russian handball player, playing on the Russian women's national handball team. She won the gold medal with the Russian winning team in the 2007 World Women's Handball Championship. She played for 11 years in Lada Togliatti, before moving to Zvezda Zvenigorod in Summer 2012.

References

External links
 

1979 births
Living people
People from Balashikha
Russian female handball players
Handball players at the 2008 Summer Olympics
Handball players at the 2012 Summer Olympics
Olympic handball players of Russia
Olympic silver medalists for Russia
Olympic medalists in handball
Medalists at the 2008 Summer Olympics
Sportspeople from Moscow Oblast